Chiraz Bechri (born 23 July 1998) is a Tunisian professional tennis player.

Bechri has a career-high singles ranking of 580, achieved on 14 December 2015. She also has a career-high doubles ranking of 765, set on 8 November 2018. Bechri has won one singles title and two doubles titles on the ITF Women's Circuit so far in her career.

She has represented Tunisia in Fed Cup, where she has a win–loss record of 19–12.

ITF Circuit finals

Singles: 5 (1 titles, 4 runner–ups)

Doubles: 4 (2 titles, 2 runner–ups)

External links
 
 
 

1998 births
Living people
Tunisian female tennis players
Mediterranean Games competitors for Tunisia
Competitors at the 2018 Mediterranean Games
Competitors at the 2022 Mediterranean Games
21st-century Tunisian women